The Apopka Seaboard Air Line Railway Depot is a historic Seaboard Air Line Railroad depot in Apopka, Florida, United States. It is located at 36 East Station Street. The station was built in 1918 to serve a line originally used by the Tavares, Orlando, and Atlantic Railroad in 1885. On March 15, 1993, it was added to the U.S. National Register of Historic Places. In 2010, a proposal was made to relocate the depot.

References

External links
 Orange County listings at National Register of Historic Places
 Orange County listings at Florida's Office of Cultural and Historical Programs

Railway stations on the National Register of Historic Places in Florida
National Register of Historic Places in Orange County, Florida
Former railway stations in Florida
Former Seaboard Air Line Railroad stations
Railway stations in the United States opened in 1918
Apopka, Florida
1918 establishments in Florida
Transportation buildings and structures in Orange County, Florida